The Order of Grenada is an order of chivalry and a society of honour instituted by Queen Elizabeth II in right of Grenada through the National Honours and Awards Act which having been passed by the House of Representatives of Grenada on 16 November 2007 and passed by the Senate of Grenada on 27 November 2007 received Royal Assent on 31 December 2007.

The order recognises distinguished and outstanding service or meritorious service or achievement, or for gallantry. Nationals of Grenada and non-nationals may receive this Order.

King Charles III is the sovereign of the order in his capacity as King of Grenada. Appointments to the Order are made by the Governor-General of Grenada, as Grand Master, who acts on the advise of the Prime Minister of Grenada and the National Awards Advisory Committee.

The Governor-General is formally advised by the National Awards Advisory Committee which consists of a citizen of Grenada appointed by the Governor-General after consultation with the Prime Minister of Grenada and the Leader of the Opposition, the Chairperson of the Public Service Commission, the Commissioner of Police,  two persons representative of the public appointed by the Governor General one of whom is nominated by the Prime Minister and one nominated by the Leader of the Opposition, and two persons nominated appointed by the Governor General after consultation with civil society and with the religious community.

The Governor-General conducts viceregal investitures at Government House in St George's. Awards are usually announced each year on the occasion of the National Day of Grenada - 7 February.

The Order of Grenada consists of the Sovereign (King of Grenada), the Chancellor (Governor-General of Grenada), and consists of six individual awards and one Order of Knighthood consisting of six grades:

- The Companion of the Order of Grenada

- The Order of Grenada Gold Award for Excellence
 
- The Spice Isle Award

- The Camerhogne Award

- The Medal of Honour

- The Most Distinguished Order of the Nation which is an Order of Knighthood consisting of six grades and associated prefixes and post nominals:
1. Knight Grand Collar (KN) or Dame Grand Collar (DN)
2. Knight Grand Cross (GCNG) or Dame Grand Cross (DGNG)
3. Knight Commander (KCNG) or Dame Commander (DCNG)
4. Commander (CNG)
5. Officer (ONG)
6. Member (MNG)

Citizens of other countries may be admitted to the order as members ad honorem.

Much like other royal or national Orders of other Commonwealth realms such as the United Kingdom, Australia, New Zealand, and Antigua and Barbuda, Knights Grand Collar, Knights Grand Cross and Knights Commanders (categories 1, 2 and 3 above) are entitled to prefix the title Sir, and Dames Grand Collar, Dames Grand Cross and Dames Commanders to prefix Dame, to their forenames for life. Permission to use these titles outside Grenada remain the prerogative of each jurisdiction. 

Wives of Knights may prefix Lady to their surname, but no equivalent privilege exists for husbands of Dames. Such forms are not used by peers and princes, except when the names of the former are written out in their fullest forms.  All grades of the Order come with post nominals of their grade.

The Governor-General of Grenada may also award outside of the National Honours and Award Act the Governor-General Medal of Honour in gold, silver or bronze in recognition of personal service to the Crown, the Governor-General or the Office of the Governor-General. This award is used across other Caribbean Realms including St Lucia and Antigua and Barbuda, having been approved by Elizabeth II for that purpose.

References

External links

 Chapter 204A National Honours and Awards Act | Government of Grenada

Grenadian awards
Dynastic orders
Awards established in 2007
2007 establishments in North America